Scott Rodgers Heckert (born November 21, 1993) is an American professional racing driver. He previously drove full-time in NASCAR for three years in the NASCAR K&N Pro Series East; in the last of those years, 2015, he finished second in the point standings. Heckert has also driven in the ARCA Racing Series, the Blancpain GT World Challenge America, NASCAR Cup Series, and the NASCAR Xfinity Series during his career.

Racing career

NASCAR

K&N Pro Series East
Heckert's first season in the series, 2013, saw him log only two top ten finishes for team owner B. J. McLeod. However, Heckert mostly stayed out of trouble, retiring because of a crash only once. In 2014, he switched to Turner Scott Motorsports, where he grabbed three poles and two wins, both at road courses. In 2015, Heckert moved to HScott Motorsports with Justin Marks, he recorded another two wins, as many poles, and was in contention for the series championship in the final race.

Xfinity Series

Heckert debuted in 2016 at New Hampshire Motor Speedway, where he finished twenty sixth, driving for B. J. McLeod Motorsports. Three races later at Watkins Glen International, he recorded his first top twenty finish with a sixteenth. Running another road course race at Road America, Heckert was running inside the top 20 until contact with James Davison in the final corner of the race relegated him to 29th. Two years later, Heckert returned to McLeod team, and drove the No. 78 for the team at Chicagoland Speedway, his first Xfinity start on an oval, and the No. 8 at both Watkins Glen International and Road America. He would run the No. 5 (the renumbered No. 8 car from 2018) at Watkins Glen in 2019, where he picked up his career-best 13th place finish, and Mid-Ohio Sports Car Course in the No. 78. In both races, he drove an entry for the team instead of their full-time driver Matt Mills. Heckert returned to BJMM again in 2020, making it his third year in a row and the fourth of the previous five years running at least one of the road course races for the team. His first start of the season came at Road America, where he drove the No. 78 again, replacing the full-time driver of that car, Vinnie Miller.

Sports cars
In 2016, Heckert made the move to the Pirelli World Challenge, crediting simulators such as iRacing for a quick transition from stock cars, which included podium results early on. By the end of the 2016 season, Heckert had collected multiple victories in the GTS class. Heckert found overall victory at Virginia International Raceway in 2018 with Lone Star Racing and co-driver Mike Skeen in what was then named the Blancpain GT World Challenge America.

Cup Series

Heckert made his NASCAR Cup Series debut on February 21, 2021, driving for Live Fast Motorsports in the No. 78 Ford at the Daytona International Speedway road course.

Personal life
Heckert is a graduate of Miami University, holding a degree in mechanical engineering.

Motorsports career results

NASCAR
(key) (Bold – Pole position awarded by qualifying time. Italics – Pole position earned by points standings or practice time. * – Most laps led.)

Cup Series

Xfinity Series

 Season still in progress
 Ineligible for series points

K&N Pro Series East

ARCA Racing Series
(key) (Bold – Pole position awarded by qualifying time. Italics – Pole position earned by points standings or practice time. * – Most laps led.)

References

External links

 
 

Living people
1993 births
People from Ridgefield, Connecticut
NASCAR drivers
Racing drivers from Connecticut
Sportspeople from Fairfield County, Connecticut
Mercedes-AMG Motorsport drivers